Risoba vialis is a species of moth of the family Nolidae. It is found in India, Philippines, Sulawesi and Sundaland.

References

External links
images at boldsystems.org

Nolidae
Moths described in 1881